A large proportion of living species on Earth live a parasitic way of life. Parasites have traditionally been seen as targets of eradication efforts, and they have often been overlooked in conservation efforts. In the case of parasites living in the wild – and thus harmless to humans and domesticated animals – this view is changing.

Endangered parasite species

A note published in 1990 pointed out that the captive breeding and reintroduction program to save the black-footed ferret would cause the loss of its specific parasites and demanded "equal rights for parasites". A paper in 1992 warned that not only the loss of certain host species from the wild, but host population bottlenecks or the fragmentation of host populations would predictably lead to the extinction of host-specific parasites. The paper also noted that parasites exert selective pressures upon their host populations that increase host genetic diversity. At first, this view met with open scepticism. However, it became clear that the co-extinction of hosts and their specific parasites is likely to increase the current estimates of extinction rates significantly. A decade later, a study focusing on highly host-specific groups such as fig wasps, parasites, butterflies, and myrmecophil butterflies estimated the number of parasites put at risk by the endangered status of the host at about 6300. Other authors argued that host-specific parasite faunae have an unexpected advantage for conservation scientists. Their genealogies and population genetic patterns may help to illuminate their hosts' evolutionary and demographic history. Recently, scientists suggested that rich parasite faunae are inevitably needed for healthy ecosystem functioning and also that parasites and mutualists are the most endangered species on Earth. Even vets have started to argue about the conservational values of parasite species.

A recent study on parasites of coral reef fish suggested that extinction of a coral reef fish species would eventually result in the coextinction of at least ten species of parasites. Although this number might seem high, the study included only large parasites such as parasitic worms and crustaceans, but not microparasites such as Myxosporea and Microsporidia.

Example: extinct avian lice

The list below follows that of Mey (2005)

Acutifrons caracarensis parasite of the extinct Guadalupe caracara (Caracara lutosa), Guadalupe Island, Mexico;
Longimenopon dominicanum parasite of the extinct Guadalupe storm petrel, Oceanodroma macrodactyla, Guadelupe Island, Mexico;
Rallicola piageti parasite of the possibly extinct New Caledonian rail (Gallirallus lafresnayanus), New Caledonia;
Coloceras hemiphagae  parasite of the extinct Norfolk Island pigeon (Hemiphaga novaeseelandiae spadicea), Norfolk Island, New Zealand;
Coloceras restinctus parasite of the extinct Norfolk Island pigeon (Hemiphaga novaeseelandiae spadicea), Norfolk Island, New Zealand;
Rallicola extinctus parasite of the extinct huia (Heteralocha acutirostris), New Zealand;
Philopteroides xenicus parasite of the extinct bushwren (Xenicus longipes), New Zealand;
 Psittacobrosus bechsteini parasite of the extinct Cuban red macaw (Ara tricolor), Cuba;
 Colpocephalum californici, parasite of the California condor (Gymnogyps californianus). The host was saved by a captive breeding and repatriation program, but the parasite was lost, deliberately killed whenever it was found during the program.

Additionally, Columbicola extinctus is a parasite of the extinct passenger pigeon (Ectopistes migratorius). However, recent taxonomic studies show that it is conspecific with the lice living on band-tailed pigeon (Columba fasciata), thus it is not extinct.

Deliberate extermination

Naturally, medical and veterinary sciences have attempted to exterminate parasites and pathogens living in humans and in domesticated animals. In the case of a few highly host-specific pathogens, this means the extinction of the entire pathogen species. Throughout human history, however, only two species, the smallpox virus and the rinderpest virus, have been wholly eradicated. The last reported cases of smallpox occurred 1978, while the last confirmed case of rinderpest was reported in 2001. However, secure samples of the smallpox virus are known to exist in the United States and Russia, purportedly for defensive purposes such as developing new vaccines, antiviral drugs, as well as for diagnostic tests. It is not known, but is speculated that these countries may have shared their samples with some of their allies during the Cold War. Stocks of the rinderpest virus are also maintained by some secure laboratories.

Two other diseases are currently the subjects of global eradication programs: poliovirus and Dracunculus medinensis, the guinea worm. The 175 diagnosed wild polio virus (WPV) cases worldwide in 2019 represented the highest number of cases since 2014, but still a  reduction from the 719 diagnosed cases in 2000 and a  reduction from the estimated 350,000 cases when the eradication effort began in 1988. Of the three strains of polio virus, the last recorded wild case caused by type2 (WPV2) was in 1999, and WPV2 was declared eradicated in 2015. Type3 (WPV3) is last known to have caused polio in 2012, and was declared eradicated in 2019. All wild-virus cases since that date have been due to type1 (WPV1). Three countries remain where the disease is still classified as endemic—Afghanistan, Pakistan and Nigeria. The guinea worm, once widespread across some 20 nations of Africa and Asia, today survives only in four of the countries of Sub-Saharan Africa, with only a few hundred known cases of infection in 2011. Prevalent civil wars in the region, such as the War in Darfur, by preventing safe access to medical aid, have resulted in the survival of this species up to the present.

See also
Conservation-induced extinction

References

Conservation biology
Parasitology